Francis Baines may refer to:

 Francis Baines (cricketer) (1864–1948), English cricketer
 Francis Baines (Jesuit) (1648–1710), English Jesuit
 Francis Baines (musician) (1917–1999), British composer and double-bass player